Kim Dong-Kyu  (born May 13, 1981) is a South Korean football player who since 2008 has played for Ulsan Hyundai (formerly Gwangju Sangmu).

References

1981 births
Living people
South Korean footballers
Association football midfielders
Ulsan Hyundai FC players
Gimcheon Sangmu FC players